Cheon Ho-sun (born September 10, 1962 in Seoul), alternatively spelled Chun Ho-sun, is a South Korean politician. He has a bachelor's degree in sociology from Yonsei University. He is the chairman of Justice Party.

External links

References

Yonsei University alumni
People from Seoul
1962 births
Living people
Democratic Party (South Korea, 2000) politicians
Justice Party (South Korea) politicians
Justice Party (South Korea)
Asian social liberals
Yeongyang Cheon clan